Willis Mountain is a monadnock rising from the rolling Piedmont hills of Buckingham County, Virginia, near the geographic center of the state. It is composed of Kyanite-bearing quartz that weathers more slowly than the surrounding material. The Kyanite Mining Corporation of Dillwyn has mined Willis Mountain long enough to reduce significantly the profile of the mountain.

References

External links
 
 Northern Virginia Community College: "Kyanite Mining at Willis Mountain, Virginia"

Inselbergs of North America
Mountains of Virginia
Landforms of Buckingham County, Virginia